The Levant Company was an English chartered company formed in 1592. Elizabeth I of England approved its initial charter on 11 September 1592 when the Venice Company (1583) and the Turkey Company (1581) merged, because their charters had expired, as she was eager to maintain trade and political alliances with the Ottoman Empire.
Its initial charter was good for seven years and was granted to Edward Osborne, Richard Staper, Thomas Smith and William Garrard with the purpose of regulating English trade with the Ottoman Empire and the Levant. The company remained in continuous existence until being superseded in 1825. A member of the company was known as a Turkey Merchant.

History
The origins of the Levant Company lay in the Italian trade with Constantinople, and the wars against the Turks in Hungary, although a parallel was routed to Morocco and the Barbary Coast on a similar trade winds as early as 1413. The collapse of the Venetian empire, high tariffs, and the ousting of the Genoese from Scio (Chios) had left a vacuum that was filled by a few intrepid adventurers in their own cog vessels with endeavour to reopen trade with the East on their own accounts. Following a decline in trade with the Levant over a number of decades, several London merchants petitioned Queen Elizabeth I in 1580 for a charter to guarantee exclusivity when trading in that region. In 1580 a treaty was signed between England and the Ottoman Empire, giving English merchants trading rights similar to those enjoyed by French merchants. In 1582 William Harborne, an English merchant who had carried out most of the treaty negotiations in Constantinople to French protestations, made himself permanent envoy. But by 1586 Harborne was appointed 'Her Majesty's ambassador' to the Ottoman Empire, with all his expenses (including gifts given to the Sultan and his court) to be paid by the Levant Company. When the charters of both the Venice Company and the Turkey Company expired, both companies were merged into the Levant Company in 1592 after Queen Elizabeth I approved its charter as part of her diplomacy with the Ottoman Empire.

The company had no colonial aspirations, but rather established "factories" (trading centers) in already-established commercial centers, such as the Levant Factory in Aleppo, as well as Constantinople, Alexandria and Smyrna. Throughout the company's history, Aleppo served as headquarters for the whole company in the Middle East. By 1588, the Levant Company had been converted to a regulated monopoly on an established trade route, from its initial character as a joint-stock company. The prime movers in the conversion were Sir Edward Osborne and Richard Staper.

In January 1592, a new charter was granted and by 1595 its character as a regulated company had become clear. In the early days of the company there were threats not just from Barbary pirates but also from Spain during the 1585 to 1604 war. In that conflict however the company with its heavily armed ships managed to repel the Spanish galleys intent on capturing the cargo in a number of pitched naval battles, in 1586, 1590, 1591 and 1600 The company as a result surrendered some of their ships to the English Crown and were used during the Spanish Armada campaign proving their worth.

James I (1603–25) renewed and confirmed the company's charter in 1606, adding new privileges. However he engaged in a verbal anti-Turk crusade and neglected direct relations with the Turks. The government did not interfere with trade, which expanded. Especially profitable was the arms trade as the Porte modernised and re-equipped its forces. Of growing importance was textile exports. Between 1609 and 1619, the export of cloth to the Turks increased from 46% to 79% of total cloth exports. The business was highly lucrative. Piracy continued to be a threat. Despite the anti-Ottoman rhetoric of the king, commercial relations with the Turks expanded. The king's finances were increasingly based on the revenues derived from this trade, and English diplomacy was complicated by this trade. For example, James refused to provide financial support to Poland for its war against the Turks.

During the English Civil War (1642–1651), some innovations were made in the government of the company, allowing many people to become members who were not qualified by the charters of Elizabeth and James, or who did not conform to the regulations prescribed. Charles II, upon his restoration, endeavored to set the company upon its original basis; to which end, he gave them a charter, containing not only a confirmation of their old one, but also several new articles of reformation.

Organisation in 1661
By the charter of King Charles II in 1661, the company was erected into a body politic, capable of making laws, under the title of the Company of Merchants of England trading to the Seas of the Levant. The number of members was not limited, but averaged about 300. The principal qualification required was that the candidate be a wholesale merchant, either by family, or by serving an apprenticeship of seven years. Those under 25 years of age paid 25 pounds at their admission; those above, twice as much. Each made an oath, at his entrance, not to send any merchandise to the Levant, except on his own account; and not to consign them to any but the company's agents, or factors. The company governed itself by a plurality of voices.

The company had a court, or board at London, composed of a governor, sub-governor, and twelve directors, or assistants; who were all actually to live in London, or the suburbs. They also had a deputy-governor, in every city and port where there were any members of the company. This assembly at London sent out the vessels, regulated the tariff for the price at which the European merchandise sent to the Levant were to be sold; and for the quality of those returned. It raised taxes on merchandise, to defray impositions, and the common expense of the company; presented the ambassador, which the King was to keep at the port; elected two consuls for Smyrna and Constantinople, etc. As the post of ambassador to the Sublime Porte became increasingly important, the Crown had to assume control of the appointment.

One of the best regulations of the company was not to leave the consuls, or even the ambassador, to fix the impositions on the vessels for defraying the common expenses—something that was fatal to the companies of most other nations—but to allow a pension to the ambassador and consuls, and even to the chief officers—including the chancellor, secretary, chaplain, interpreters, and janissaries—so that there was no pretence for their raising any sum at all on the merchants or merchandises. It was true that the ambassador and consul might act alone on these occasions, but the pensions being offered to them on condition of declining them, they chose not to act.

In extraordinary cases, the consuls, and even ambassador himself, had recourse to two deputies of the company, residing in the Levant, or if the affair be very important, assemble the whole nation. Here were regulated the presents to be given, the voyages to be made, and every thing to be deliberated; and on the resolutions here taken, the deputies appointed the treasurer to furnish the required funds. The ordinary commerce of this company employed from 20 to 25 vessels, of between 25 and 30 pieces of cannon.

The merchandises exported there were limited in quality and range, suggesting an imbalance of trade; they included traditional cloths, especially shortcloth and kerseys, tin, pewter, lead, pepper, re-exported cochineal, black rabbit skins and a great deal of American silver, which the English took up at Cadiz. The more valuable returns were in raw silk, cotton wool and yarn, currants and "Damascus raisins", nutmeg, pepper, indigo, galls, camlets, wool and cotton cloth, the soft leathers called maroquins, soda ash for making glass and soap, and several gums and medicinal drugs. Velvet, carpets, and silk were bought by the traders.

The commerce of the company to Smyrna, Constantinople, and İskenderun, was much less considerable than that of the East India Company; but was, more advantageous to England, because it took off much more of the English products than the other, which was chiefly carried on in money. The places reserved for the commerce of this company included all the states of Venice, in the Gulf of Venice; the state of Ragusa; all the states of the "Grand Signior" (the Ottoman Sultan), and the ports of the Levant and Mediterranean Basin; excepting Cartagena, Alicante, Barcelona, Valencia, Marseilles, Toulon, Genoa, Livorno (Leghorn), Civitavecchia, Palermo, Messina, Malta, Majorca, Menorca, and Corsica; and other places on the coasts of France, Spain, and Italy.

Levantine shipping 
Ships owned by the Levant Company from 1581 to 1640:

 Alathia
 Alcede
 Alice and Thomas
 Alice Thomas
 Aleppo Merchant
 Angel
 Anne Frane
 Ascension
 Bark Burre
 Barque Reynolds
 Centurion
 Charity
 Cherubim
 Christ
 Clement
 Cock
 Concord
 Consent
 Cosklett
 Darling
 Delight
 Desire
 Diamond
 Dragon
 Eagle
 Edward Bonaventure
 Elizabeth and Dorcas
 Elizabeth Cocken
 Elizabeth Stoaks
 Elnathan
 Emanuel
 Experience
 Freeman
 George Bonaventure
 Gift of God
 Golden Noble
 Grayhound
 Great Phoenix
 Great Suzanne
 Greenfield
 Guest
 Gyllyon
 Harry
 Harry Bonaventure
 Hector
 Hercules
 Husband
 Industry
 The Jane
 Jesus
 Jewel
 Job
 John
 John Francis
 Jollian
 Jonas
 Lanavit
 Lewis
 Little George
 London
 Margaret
 Margaret Bonaventure
 Marget and John
 Marigold
 Mary
 Mary Anne
 Mary Coust
 Mary Martin
 Mary Rose
 Mayflower
 Merchant Bonaventure
 Mignon
 Paragon
 Peregrine
 Phoenix
 Primrose
 Prosperous
 Providence
 Rainbow
 Rebecca
 Recovery
 Red Lion
 Report
 Resolution
 Roebuck
 Royal Defence
 Royal Exchange
 Royal Merchant
 Saker
 Salamander
 Salutation
 Samaritan
 Sampson
 Samuel
 Saphire
 Scipio
 Society
 Solomon
 Suzanne
 Suzanne Parnell
 Swallow
 Teagre
 Thomas and William
 Thomas Bonaventure
 Thomasine
 Toby of Harwich
 Trinity
 Trinity Bear
 Triumph
 Unicorn
 White Hind
 William and John
 William and Ralph
 William and Thomas
 William Fortune

Governors

 1581–1592       Sir Edward Osborne (nominated in first & second charters)
 1592–1592       Richard Staper
 1600–1600       Sir Thomas Smith (nominated in third charter)
 1605–1623 Sir Thomas Lowe (nominated in fourth charter)
 1623–1634 Sir Hugh Hammersley
 1634–1643 Sir Henry Garraway
 1643–1653 Isaac Penington
 1654–1672 Sir Andrew Riccard
 1672–1673 John Jolliffe
 1673–1695 The Earl of Berkeley
 1696–1709 Sir William Trumbull
 1710–1718 The Lord Onslow
 1718–1735 The Earl of Carnavon
 1736–1766 The Earl De La Warr
 1766–1772 The Earl of Shaftsbury
 1772–1776 The Earl of Radnor
 1776–1792 The Earl of Guilford
 1792–1799 The Duke of Leeds
 1799–1821 The Lord Grenville

The British government took over the Company in 1821 until its dissolution in 1825.

The ambassadors at Constantinople

 1582–1588 William Harborne
 1588–1597 Edward Barton
 1597–1607 Henry Lello
 1606–1611 Sir Thomas Glover
 1611–1620 Paul Pindar
 1619–1621 Sir John Eyre (or Ayres)
 1621–1622 John Chapman (agent)
 1621–1628 Sir Thomas Roe
 1627–1638 Sir Peter Wyche
 1633–1647 Sir Sackville Crowe
 1647–1661 Sir Thomas Bendysh
 Richard Salway (never sent out)
 Richard Lawrence (agent only)
 1668–1672 Heneage Finch, Earl of Winchilsea
 1668–1672 Sir Daniel Harvey
 1672–1681 Sir John Finch
 1680–1687 James, Lord Chandos
 1684–1686 Sir William Soames
 1686–1691 Sir William Trumbull
 1690–1691 Sir William Hussey
 Thomas Coke (chargé d'affaires only)
 1691–1692 William Harbord
 1692–1702 William, Lord Paget
 Sir James Rushout, 1st Baronet (nominated only)
 George Berkeley, 1st Earl of Berkeley (nominated only)
 1700–1717 Sir Robert Sutton
 1716–1718 Edward Wortley-Montagu
 1717–1730 Abraham Stanyan
 1729–1736 George Hay, 8th Earl of Kinnoull
 1735–1746 Sir Everard Fawkener
 Stanhope Aspinwall (chargé d'affaires only)
 1746–1762 James Porter
 1761–1765 Henry Grenville
 William Kinloch (chargé d'affaires only)
 1765–1775 John Murray
 Anthony Hayes (Chargé d'affaires only)
 1775–1794 Sir Robert Ainslie
 1794–1795 Robert Liston
 Spencer Smith (Chargé d'affaires)
 Francis James Jackson (never took up appointment)
 1799–1803 Thomas Bruce, 7th Earl of Elgin
 Alexander Straton (Chargé d'affaires)
 1803–1804 William Drummond
 1804–1807 Charles Arbuthnot
 1809–1810 Robert Adair
 1810–1812 Stratford Canning Minister Plenipotentiary
 1812–1820 Robert Liston
 1820–1824 Percy Clinton, 6th Viscount Strangford.

Consuls

At Smyrna 

 1611–1624 William Markham
 1624–1630 William Salter
 1630–1633 Lawrence Green
 1633–1634 James Higgins
 1634–1635 John Freeman
 1635–1638 Edward Bernard
 1638–1643 Edward Stringer
 1644–1649 John Wilde
 1649–1657 Spencer Bretton
 1659–1660 William Prideaux
 1660–1661 Richard Baker
 1661–1667 William Cave
 1667–1677 Paul Rycaut
 1677–1703 William Raye
 1703–1716 William Sherrard
 1716–1722 John Cooke
 1722–1723 George Boddington
 1733–1741 Francis Williams
 1741–1742 Thomas Carleton
 1742–1762 Samuel Crawley
 1762–1794 Anthony Hayes
 1794–1825 Francis Werry

At Aleppo 

 1580–1586 William Barrett
 1586–1586 James Toverson
 1586–1586 John Eldred
 1592–1594 Michael Locke
 1596 George Dorrington (acting vice-consul)
 1596–1596 Thomas Sandys
 1596–1597 Ralph Fitch
 1597–1597 Richard Colthurst
 vacant
 1606 James Hawarde (acting vice-consul)
 1606–1610 Paul Pindar
 1610–1616 Bartholomew Haggatt
 1616–1621 Libby Chapman
 1621–1627 Edward Kirkham
 1627–1630 Thomas Potton
 1630–1638 John Wandesford
 1638–1649 Edward Bernard
 1649–1659 Henry Riley
 1659–1672 Benjamin Lannoy
 1672–1686 Gamaliel Nightingale
 1686–1689 Thomas Metcalfe
 1689–1701 Henry Hastings
 1701–1706 George Brandon
 1707–1715 William Pilkington
 1716–1726 John Purnell
 1727–1740 Nevil Coke
 1740–1745 Nathaniel Micklethwait
 1745–1751 Arthur Pollard
 1751–1758 Alexander Drummond
 1758–1758 Francis Browne
 1759–1766 William Kinloch
 1766–1768 Henry Preston
 1768–1770 William Clark
 1770–1772 Charles Smith (pro-consul)
 1770–1783 John Abbott
 1783–1784 David Hays (pro-consul)
 1784–1786 Charles Smith (pro-consul)
 1786–1791 Michael de Vezin (pro-consul)
 factory closed 1791–1803
 1803–1825 John Barker

Shipping numbers: Turkey and the Levant

Chaplains

Decline

Membership began declining in the early eighteenth century. In its decline the company was looked upon as an abuse, a drain on the resources of Britain. The company's purview was thrown open to free trade in 1754, but continued its activities until dissolution in 1825.

The name of the bird called 'turkey' came from the Turkey merchants.

Turkish opium was bought by the Levant Company.

The Levant Company encompassed American merchants before 1811 who bought Turkish opium. These merchants would sell the opium to the Chinese, beginning in 1806. Among these American Turkey merchants were members of the famous Astor family.

Heraldry

The arms of the Levant Company were: Azure, on a sea in base proper, a ship with three masts in full sail or, between two rocks of the second, all the sails, pennants, and ensigns argent, each charged with a cross gules, a chief engrailed of the third, in base a seahorse proper. * The crest was: On a wreath of the colours, a demi seahorse saliant.
 The supporters were: Two seahorses.
 The Latin motto was: Deo reipublica et amicis ("For God, the Commonwealth and our Friends").

See also
 Chartered companies
 British foreign policy in the Middle East

Notes

References

Manuscripts 
 
 Harley MSS, 306 Standing Ordinances of the Levant Company (ff.72-4) c.1590
 Lansdowne MSS. 60 Petition of the Turkey and Venice Merchants to be incorporated into one body (f.8) c.1590-1
 MSS Bodleian Library Folio 665, (i List of the Membership of The Levant Company, 1701 (ff.97-8)
 British Museum, 1718. Paragraphs of Some Letters to Prove the Reasonablness of The Levant Company 's late order to carry on their trade by general ships, Bodleian Pamphlets, Folio 666, ff.288-9.
 1718–1719, The Case of The Levant Company, British Museum. 351–356, 6(40)
 1825, Proceedings of The Levant Company respecting the Surrender of their Charters, BM6/6259

Sources 
 
 
 
  Covers the years of the periodic charterers, 1581–1605 and the permanent charter to 1640.

Further reading

External links 

 http://www.aim25.ac.uk/cgi-bin/vcdf/detail?coll_id=18428&inst_id=118

 
Chartered companies
Trading companies of England
Defunct companies of England
1592 establishments in England
Trading companies established in the 16th century
Organizations established in the 1590s
British companies disestablished in 1825
Defunct shipping companies of the United Kingdom
Elizabethan era
Economic history of England
Economy of the Ottoman Empire